Robert J. Stransky (born January 30, 1936) was an American football player.  He grew up in Yankton, South Dakota, and attended the University of Colorado where he played college football at the tailback and safety positions for the Colorado Buffaloes football team from 1956 to 1957.  He finished the 1957 season ranked second in the country with 1,097 rushing yards, and he was selected by the Football Writers Association of America and the International News Service as a first-team back on their respective 1957 College Football All-America Teams.  He later played professional football in the  Canadian Football League as a halfback for the Winnipeg Blue Bombers (1958) and BC Lions (1959)., and in 1960 with the Denver Broncos of the American Football League.  He was inducted into the University of Colorado Athletic Hall of Fame in 2010.

References

1936 births
Living people
People from Yankton, South Dakota
Players of American football from South Dakota
American football halfbacks
Colorado Buffaloes football players
All-American college football players
American players of Canadian football
Canadian football fullbacks
Winnipeg Blue Bombers players
BC Lions players